Gadsden School District 32 is a school district in Yuma County, Arizona, headquartered in San Luis.

References

External links
 

School districts in Yuma County, Arizona